λ Pictoris, Latinised as Lambda Pictoris, is a solitary, orange-hued star in the southern constellation of Pictor. It is visible to the naked eye, having an apparent visual magnitude of +5.29. With an annual parallax shift of 8.71 mas as seen from the Earth, it is located around 374 light-years from the Sun. At the estimated age of 2.24 billion years old, it is an evolved K-type giant star with a stellar classification of K0/1 III.

References

K-type giants
Pictor (constellation)
Pictoris, Lambda
030185
021914
1516
Durchmusterung objects